General Walton may refer to:

Joseph Walton (British Army officer) (died 1808), British Army major general
Leo A. Walton (1890–1961), U.S. Air Force major general
William Lovelace Walton (1788–1865), British Army general

See also
Attorney General Walton (disambiguation)